The 2011 Ladies Tour of Qatar (2–4 February 2011, Qatar) was the third running of the Ladies Tour of Qatar cycling stage race. The Union Cycliste Internationale (UCI) rated it as 'category 2.1'.

Teams
The peloton numbered eighty-nine riders from fifteen teams. There were nine UCI teams and six national teams. Fourteen teams had six riders. One team had five riders. The teams that participated in the tour were:

Stages

Stage 1
2 February 2011 – Camelodrome to Dukhan, 

The first stage began in fine weather at 12.30 pm. Rochelle Gilmore (Australia) of Lotto Honda won the stage, the points standings and the gold jersey with a 5-second advantage over Giorgia Bronzini (Italy). Veronica Andréasson (Sweden) made a break at 54 km after the second intermediate sprint and held the lead for 3 km. 25 km from the finish, Valentina Bastianelli made an unsuccessful break. 5 km from the finish, the peloton remained bunched. On reaching a slight uphill portion near Dukhan, a group of twelve riders broke away to reach the finish 15 seconds before the main group. Hosking won the 'best young rider' class for the stage.

Stage 2
3 February 2011 – Doha to Lusail, 
The second stage was held in windy conditions. There was a headwind for the first 40 km. After one hour, the riders had covered only 26.6 km. HTC Highroad raced best with three riders in the decisive breakaway. At 15 km, Bastianelli broke away and took a lead of 1 sec/km at 18.5 km. She was caught by the peloton at 25 km. At 36 km, following a crash, a group of eight riders broke away from the main group. The breakaway group included four HTC Highroad riders (Ellen van Dijk, Charlotte Becker, Chloe Hosking (in the white jersey) and Adrie Visser); three Garmin–Cervélo riders (Alex Rhodes, Trine Schmidt, Iris Slappendel and Loes Gunnewijk (Holland)). The first intermediate sprint at 41.5 km was won by Van Dijk who was 45 seconds ahead of the main group. Hosking dropped from the leading group due to a mechanical problem. At 57.5 km, Van Dijk won the second bonus sprint by one minute and five seconds. In the first passage about the final circuit in Lusail, seven riders had a lead of one minute and fifty-five seconds. With one lap left, the gap increased to two minutes and fifty-five seconds. 5 km from the finish, Schmidt and Visser broke away but were caught at 2 km from the finish. Van Dijk won the final sprint ahead of Rhodes and Visser and took the gold jersey with a fifteen-second advantage over Becker and a twenty-one second advantage over Slappendel. Van Dijk also led the points and 'best young rider' standings.

Stage 3
4 February 2011 – Al Daayen to Doha, 
The third stage began at the Al Dayeen resort with 87 riders. Megan Guarnier (USA) made a number of attempts to break away before achieving a lead at 28 km. At the final circuit, she held a 10-second advantage which increased to 22 seconds. At 47.5 km, she was caught by the peloton. At 65.5 km, with six laps to go, ten riders broke away from the main group. They included Nicole Cooke, an Olympian and Valentina Scandolara (Italy). The leading ten riders had a twenty-three second advantage over the pack at the second bonus sprint which was won by Scandolara. With four laps to go, the front group had made a gap of 32 seconds. As the pack moved closer, Cooke and De Goede broke away in the final 5 kilometers but their effort failed when the peloton caught them at 2 km from the finish. The final sprint was won by Monia Bacaille (Italy). Giorgia Bronzini (Italy) came second.
In the standings, van Dijk who was fourth in stage three, won the race. She had a 15-second lead over Becker and 20 seconds over Slapendel. Van Dijk also won on points and also the 'best young rider' class. HTC Highroad won 'best team'.

Leaders classes
Three jerseys were awarded. The leader of the general class received a golden jersey and first place in the race. The result was calculated by adding the cyclist's finishing time, after each stage, to time bonuses won. 
The cyclist with the highest number of points received a silver jersey. Points were scored for finishing in the top three in the intermediate sprint and for finishing in the top twenty in a stage. At the intermediate sprint, first received 3 points, second, 2 points and third, one point. The stage winner received 30 points; second, 27 points; third, 25 points; fourth, 23 points; fifth, 21 points; sixth, 19 points; seventh, 17 points; eight, 15 points; ninth, 13 points; tenth, 11 points; and one point for eleventh to twentieth place. 
The best youth (a cyclist born after 1 January 1987) received a blue jersey. The winner was determined in the same way as the general class.

Final classifications

General classification

Points Classification

Youth Classification

Team Classification

See also
2011 in women's road cycling
2011 in Qatar

References

External links

Tour of Qatar
Tour of Qatar
Ladies Tour of Qatar